Sayn-Wittgenstein-Berleburg was one of several imperial counties and later principalities ruled by the House of Sayn-Wittgenstein.

Most of the former county is located in the present district of Siegen-Wittgenstein (in the modern state of North Rhine-Westphalia), Germany. The residence was the town and palace in Berleburg (now Bad Berleburg).

History 
Sayn-Wittgenstein-Berleburg was a partition of Sayn-Wittgenstein in the 16th century; the southern and more-developed portion was the County of Sayn-Wittgenstein-Wittgenstein with its seat Laaspe (now Bad Laasphe) and its residence Wittgenstein Castle, whereas Berleburg is tucked away in a very rural landscape in the midst of vast forests. Sayn-Wittgenstein-Berleburg was raised from a county with Imperial immediacy to an immediate principality (Reichsfürstentum) in 1792, and was mediatised to the Grand Duchy of Hesse in 1806 before being annexed to Prussia in 1816.

Counts and reigning princes

Counts of Sayn-Wittgenstein-Berleburg (1607–1792) 
 Georg V (1565–1631, ruled 1607–1631)
 Ludwig Casimir (1598–1643, ruled 1631–1643)
 Georg Wilhelm (1636–1684, ruled 1643–1684)
 Ludwig Franz (1660–1694, ruled 1684–1694)
 Casimir (1687–1741, ruled 1694–1741)
 Ludwig Ferdinand (1712–1773, ruled 1741–1773)
 Christian Heinrich (1753–1800, ruled as Graf 1773–1792)

Princes of Sayn-Wittgenstein-Berleburg (since 1792) 
 Christian Heinrich, 1st Prince of Sayn-Wittgenstein-Berleburg (1753–1800, ruled as Fürst 1792–1800)
 Albrecht, 2nd Prince of Sayn-Wittgenstein-Berleburg (1777–1851, ruled 1800–1806)
 Albrecht, 3rd Prince of Sayn-Wittgenstein-Berleburg (1834–1904)
 Richard, 4th Prince of Sayn-Wittgenstein-Berleburg (27 May 1882 – 25 April 1925)
 Gustav Albrecht, 5th Prince of Sayn-Wittgenstein-Berleburg (28 February 1907 – 1944, declared dead 29 November 1969) 
 Richard, 6th Prince of Sayn-Wittgenstein-Berleburg (29 October 1934 – 13 March 2017)
 Gustav, 7th Prince of Sayn-Wittgenstein-Berleburg (born 12 January 1969)

Line of succession

Four branches of the House of Sayn were extant at the beginning of the 20th century, each having inherited its own appanage while the family enjoyed Imperial immediacy as vassals of the Holy Roman Empire. In order of seniority of legitimate descent from their progenitor, Ludwig I, Count of Sayn-Wittgenstein (1532-1605), they were the:
Princes (Fürsten) zu Sayn-Wittgenstein-Berleburg, descended from Count Georg (1565-1631)
Princes (Fürsten) zu Sayn-Wittgenstein-Sayn, descended from Count Christian Ludwig (1725-1797)
Counts zu Sayn-Wittgenstein-Berleburg, descended from Count Georg Ernst (1735-1792)
Princes (Fürsten) zu Sayn-Wittgenstein-Hohenstein, descended from Count Ludwig (1571-1634)

Some of these lines further splintered into cadet branches, both dynastic and non-dynastic, the latter including families whose right to the princely title was recognized by the Russian, Prussian or Bavarian monarchies, whereas other morganatic branches used lesser titles in Germany.
 
On the death of Ludwig, 3rd Prince of Sayn-Wittgenstein-Hohenstein in 1912, the eldest of his three sons, Hereditary Prince August (1868-1947), became 4th Prince of Sayn-Wittgenstein-Hohenstein and head of the third branch of the House of Sayn. Being a childless bachelor, the elder of whose two younger brothers, Georg (1873-1960), had married morganatically, while the younger, Wilhelm (1877-1958), was 49 and yet unmarried, August preserved the name and heritage of his branch of the House of Sayn by adopting Prince Christian Heinrich {Christian Heinrich Prinz zu Sayn-Wittgenstein-Berleburg} (1908-1953) of the Berleburg line. He was the second son of the late head of the entire House of Sayn, Richard, 4th Prince of Sayn-Wittgenstein-Berleburg (1882-1925), whose eldest son Gustav Albrecht, 5th Prince of Sayn-Wittgenstein-Berleburg (1907-1944), had inherited the senior line's fortune and position.

In November 1960, Christian Heinrich, being the divorced father of three daughters by his dynastic marriage to Countess Beatrix von Bismarck-Schönhausen {Beatrix Grafin von Bismarck-Schönhausen} (1921-2006), married Princess Dagmar Dagmar Prinzessin zu Sayn-Wittgenstein-Hohenstein (1919-2002), elder daughter of his adopted father's younger brother, Georg, who died seven months before the wedding. As Georg's children by his morganatic wife, Marie Rühm, (created Baroness von Freusburg by the reigning Prince of Lippe in 1916) had been de-morganatized by declaration of their uncle August on 11 February 1947, her marriage to Christian Heinrich was deemed a dynastic match, ensuring that their son Bernhart would be born in compliance with the house laws of his adoptive ancestors, the Sayn-Wittgenstein-Hohensteins, while also being a grandson of the last dynastic male of that family, Prince Georg.

Members 

 Casimir Johannes Prinz zu Sayn-Wittgenstein-Berleburg

 Richard, 4th Prince of Sayn-Wittgenstein-Berleburg (1882-1925)
 Gustav Albrecht, 5th Prince of Sayn-Wittgenstein-Berleburg (1907-missing 1944, declared dead 1969)
 Richard, 6th Prince of Sayn-Wittgenstein-Berleburg (1934-2017)
  Gustav, 7th Prince of Sayn-Wittgenstein-Berleburg (b 1969)
  (1) Prince Robin of Sayn-Wittgenstein-Berleburg (b 1938)
  (2) Prince Sebastian of Sayn-Wittgenstein-Berleburg (b 1971)
 (3) Prince Ferdinand of Sayn-Wittgenstein-Berleburg (b 2004)
  (4) Prince Philipp of Sayn-Wittgenstein-Berleburg (b 2011)
 Christian-Heinrich, 5th Prince of Sayn-Wittgenstein-Hohenstein (1908-1983)
  (5) Bernhart, 6th Prince of Sayn-Wittgenstein-Hohenstein (b 1962)
  (6) Wenzel, Hereditary Prince of Sayn-Wittgenstein-Hohenstein (b 1997)
  Prince Ludwig Ferdinand of Sayn-Wittgenstein-Berleburg (1910-1943)
 (7) Prince Otto Ludwig of Sayn-Wittgenstein-Berleburg (b 1938)
 (8) Prince Stanislaus of Sayn-Wittgenstein-Berleburg (b 1965)
 (9) Prince Friedrich of Sayn-Wittgenstein-Berleburg (b 1996)
  (10) Prince August of Sayn-Wittgenstein-Berleburg (b 1998)
  (11) Prince Maximilian-Alexander of Sayn-Wittgenstein-Berleburg (b 1980)
 (12) Prince Johann-Stanislaus of Sayn-Wittgenstein-Berleburg (b 1939)
 (13) Prince Otto-Ludwig of Sayn-Wittgenstein-Berleburg (b 1972)
 (14) Prince Justus-Casimir of Sayn-Wittgenstein-Berleburg (b 2005)
  (15) Prince Gustav of Sayn-Wittgenstein-Berleburg (b 2007)
  (16) Prince Constantin of Sayn-Wittgenstein-Berleburg (b 1978)
  (17) Prince Ludwig Ferdinand of Sayn-Wittgenstein-Berleburg (b 1942) 
 (18) Prince Carl Albrecht of Sayn-Wittgenstein-Berleburg (b 1976)
  (19) Prince August-Frederik of Sayn-Wittgenstein-Berleburg (b 1981)

References

External links 

Sayn-Wittgenstein-Berleburg family website (in German)
Map showing the location of the County of Sayn-Wittgenstein-Berleburg in 1789